This is a list of wars involving the Fijian tribes (pre 1871), Kingdom of Fiji (1871–1874), Colony of Fiji (1874–1970), Dominion of Fiji (1970–1987) the Republic of Fiji (1987–present).

Fijian tribes (pre 1871)

Colony of Fiji (1874–1970)

Dominion of Fiji (1970–1987)

Republic of Fiji (1987–present)

References 

Wars
Fiji
Wars